The Himalayan Mountaineering Institute (HMI Darjeeling) was established in Darjeeling, India on 4 November 1954 to encourage mountaineering as an organized sport in India. The first ascent of Mount Everest in 1953 by Tenzing Norgay and Edmund Hillary sparked a keen interest in establishing mountaineering as a well-respected endeavour for people in the region. With the impetus provided by the first prime minister of India, Jawaharlal Nehru, HMI was established in Darjeeling. Narendra Dhar Jayal, the pioneer of Indian Mountaineering, was the founding principal of the institute. Tenzing Norgay was the first director of field training for HMI. The buildings for the Institute were designed by the architect Joseph Allen Stein, then teaching at the Bengal Engineering College near Calcutta.  It was the first building in a career in India that lasted half a century.

HMI regularly conducts Adventure, Basic and Advanced Mountaineering courses. These are very comprehensive courses. They are also highly subsidised to encourage mountaineering as a sport.

History 
Tenzing Norgay became the first Director of Field Training of the Himalayan Mountaineering Institute in Darjeeling, when it was set up in 1954.

Gallery

Alumni 

 Col Narendra Kumar
Archana Sardana
 Malavath Purna
 Harshvardhan Joshi
 Satyarup Siddhanta

See also
Poorna: Hindi language biographical adventure film.

References

External links

 Official website
About Himalayan Mountaineering Institute.

Educational institutions established in 1954
Tourist attractions in Darjeeling
Mountaineering in India
Education in Darjeeling
Educational organisations based in India
Buildings and structures in Darjeeling
1954 establishments in West Bengal
Tenzing Norgay
Mountaineering training institutes